Hillside High School is a comprehensive community four-year public high school that serves students in ninth through twelfth grades from Hillside, in Union County, New Jersey, United States, operating as the lone secondary school of the Hillside Public Schools. The school has been accredited by the Middle States Association of Colleges and Schools Commission on Elementary and Secondary Schools.

As of the 2021–22 school year, the school had an enrollment of 890 students and 82.2 classroom teachers (on an FTE basis), for a student–teacher ratio of 10.8:1. There were 403 students (45.3% of enrollment) eligible for free lunch and 52 (5.8% of students) eligible for reduced-cost lunch.

Awards, recognition and rankings
The school was the 250th-ranked public high school in New Jersey out of 339 schools statewide in New Jersey Monthly magazine's September 2014 cover story on the state's "Top Public High Schools", using a new ranking methodology. The school had been ranked 166th in the state of 328 schools in 2012, after being ranked 217th in 2010 out of 322 schools listed. The magazine ranked the school 287th in 2008 out of 316 schools. The school was ranked 262nd in the magazine's September 2006 issue, which surveyed 316 schools across the state.

Programs
In 2001, students from David Brearley High School and Hillside High School collaborated to develop literary and art projects about bigotry presented at an exhibit, "Making Connections: Two Culturally Diverse Schools Address Prejudice and Hatred by Studying the Holocaust Together." The exhibit was presented at Kean University, and was viewed together with local Holocaust survivors and concentration camp liberators.

History
The district established a high school program at Central Grammar School, which was completed in 1917, prior to which Hillside students in grades 9-12 attended Elizabeth High School. The current high school facility was constructed in 1940, allowing students in grades 10-12 to be served at the new Hillside High School, at which time the Coe Avenue (A.P. Morris) School became a grammar school. Additions were later added to accommodate the baby-boomers of the 1950s and 1960s. In the mid-sixties the high school held some 1,500 students.

Athletics
The Hillside High School Comets compete in the Union County Interscholastic Athletic Conference, which is comprised of public and private high schools in Union County and was established following a reorganization of sports leagues in Northern New Jersey undertaken by the New Jersey State Interscholastic Athletic Association (NJSIAA). Before the 2010 realignment, the school had participated in the Mountain Valley Conference, which consisted of public and private high schools in Essex and Somerset and Union counties. With 634 students in grades 10-12, the school was classified by the NJSIAA for the 2019–20 school year as Group II for most athletic competition purposes, which included schools with an enrollment of 486 to 758 students in that grade range. The football team competes in Division 2A of the Big Central Football Conference, which includes 60 public and private high schools in Hunterdon, Middlesex, Somerset, Union and Warren counties, which are broken down into 10 divisions by size and location. The school was classified by the NJSIAA as Group II South for football for 2018–2020.

The football team won the North II Group II state championship in 1985 and won the Central Jersey Group II championship in 2017-2019. In 1985, the Hillside Comets football team finished with an 11–1 record and a North II Group II state championship with a 13-12 win against Madison High School in the sectional title game. After knocking off the second and third seeds in the first two rounds, the seventh-seeded Hillside team won its second North II Group II state sectional championship with a 20-13 win at High Point Solutions Stadium against top-seeded and previously undefeated Point Pleasant Borough High School in the final game of the 2017 tournament playoff. In 2018, the team defeated Manasquan High School by a score of 36-10 to win the Central Jersey Group II title. The 2019 team used two late touchdowns to win its third consecutive Central Jersey Group II title with a 14-10 win against West Deptford High School in the championship game and went on to finish the season with a 12-0 record with a 25-3 win against Cedar Creek High School in the South / Central regional bowl game.

The boys' basketball team won the Group II state championships in both 1990 and 1992, defeating Middle Township High School in the tournament final in both years. Winning a state title for the first time in six finals matches, the 1990 team scored on two foul shots with two seconds left in the game to win the Group II state title with a 50-48 victory against Middle Township in the championship game played at the Rutgers Athletic Center and advanced to the Tournament of Champions as the sixth seed, falling to number-three McCorristin Catholic High School by a score 76-49 in the quarterfinals to finish the season with a record of 27-3. The 1992 team came back from a 15-point deficit in the fourth quarter and won the Group II title in overtime by a score of 62-60 against Middle Township in the championship game played at Rutgers University.

In 2011, the Hillside High School cheerleading team, under coach Keyla Silva, won the title of State Champions at the NJCDCA competition in Trenton in the Intermediate Varsity division. After this victory the cheerleaders held this title for three years in a row, repeating as state division champion in 2012 and 2013.

Administration
The school's principal is Christine Sidwa. Her administration team includes two vice principals.

Notable alumni

 Clint Bolick (born 1957, class of 1975), Associate Justice of the Arizona Supreme Court.
 Hiram Chodosh (born 1962), Fifth president of Claremont McKenna College in Claremont, California.
 David Jones (born 1968), former NFL tight end who played for the Los Angeles Raiders in 1992.
 Marc Leepson (born 1945, class of 1963), journalist, historian, author of Saving Monticello, Flag: An American Biography, Desperate Engagement and editor of the Webster's New World Dictionary of the Vietnam War.
 Adrienne A. Mandel (born 1936), politician who represented the 19th District in the Maryland House of Delegates for more than ten years.
 Rollie Massimino (born 1934, class of 1952), coach at Hillside who went on to become a college basketball coach, best known for leading the Villanova Wildcats to an NCAA championship in 1985.
 Jerron McMillian (born 1989), NFL safety for the Green Bay Packers.
 Kendall Ogle (born 1975), linebacker who played in the NFL for two seasons with the Cleveland Browns.
 Alan Paul (born 1949), Grammy Award-winning singer and composer, best known as one of the founding members of the current incarnation of the vocal group The Manhattan Transfer.
 Arthur Seale (born 1946, class of 1964), responsible for the kidnapping and murder of Sidney Reso, the Vice President of International Operations for Exxon on April 29, 1992.
 Marquis Spruill (born 1991), football linebacker.
 Dan Studney (born 1941, class of 1959), former track and field athlete who competed in the javelin throw, winning a gold medal for the United States at the 1963 Pan American Games.
 Hela Yungst (1950–2002), Miss New Jersey 1971, representing the state in the Miss America Pageant. She changed her name to Hela Young and became the New Jersey Lottery representative on television.

References

External links 
Hillside High School
Hillside Public Schools

School Data for the Hillside Public Schools, National Center for Education Statistics

1940 establishments in New Jersey
Educational institutions established in 1940
Hillside, New Jersey
Public high schools in Union County, New Jersey